Monika Beu (born 30 April 1963) is a German volleyball player. She competed in the women's tournament at the 1988 Summer Olympics.

References

External links
 

1963 births
Living people
German women's volleyball players
Olympic volleyball players of East Germany
Volleyball players at the 1988 Summer Olympics
Volleyball players from Berlin